The Jacqui Lambie Network (JLN) is a political party in Australia, formed in May 2015. Bearing the name of its founder, Tasmanian Senator Jacqui Lambie, it has served as the political vehicle for the former independent.

The JLN was formed to allow Lambie to re-contest her Senate seat at the 2016 federal election, after she resigned from the Palmer United Party in November 2014. It gained 8.3% of the Senate popular vote in Tasmania in 2016, slightly increasing its vote share to 8.9% at the 2019 election. The JLN also fielded candidates for the 2018 Tasmanian state election. In the 2022 federal election, the party was successful in electing a second party member Tammy Tyrrell into the Senate, increasing its parliamentary composition to two senators for the first time.

The party's political positions reflect Lambie's own stances, generally presenting a big tent orientation. The JLN has maintained populist support for working class "battlers", especially welfare recipients. The party also maintains strong support for members of the armed services, owing to Lambie's own experience with the ADF. The JLN has a prioritised regional focus on Tasmania, where the party draws virtually all of its support from. Early in her political career, Lambie promoted firm nationalist sentiments, first in opposition to Sharia law, and more recently about supposed "Chinese foreign interference". In an interview with ABC News in 2018, Lambie distanced herself from her previous views on Sharia law, stating she did not want to "cause division", and was influenced by "a previous advisor that was really driving that in".

Policies 
While announcing the formation of the party, Lambie revealed the party's 12 "core beliefs", including establishing a national apprentice, trade and traineeship system incorporating both the Australian Defence Force and TAFEs, dedicated Indigenous seats in parliament, and supporting the introduction of a carbon tax.

Royal commission into veteran suicide 
In response to a Change.org petition organised by Julie-Ann Finney, whose son David Finney killed himself after a crippling battle with post-traumatic stress injury, Lambie has called for a royal commission into veteran suicide.

The Morrison Government announced their intention to appoint a National Commissioner for Defence and Veteran Suicide Prevention to inquire into the deaths by suicide of serving and former ADF members.

Lambie criticised the Government's plan in a dissenting report, noting that "The families of veterans who have taken their own lives support a Royal Commission. The institutions who are being blamed for those suicides support a National Commissioner."

On 8 July 2021 a Royal Commission into Defence and Veteran Suicide in Australia was established.

Political donations 
Lambie introduced a bill to the Australian Senate in February 2020 that proposes to tighten political donations laws. The bill seeks to amend current laws that permit political donations under $14,300 to not be disclosed. Lambie has proposed lowering this threshold to $2,500.

The bill also proposes to introduce electoral expenditure accounts for organisations that run political campaigns. This will compel parties and others to disclose the source of any money they spend on their electoral campaigns.

Australian manufacturing 
In early 2020, Lambie started a campaign to support Australian manufacturing with concerns about Australia's reliance on foreign imported products; she believes these concerns are a threat to Australia's economic sovereignty; magnified with the advent of COVID-19.

Foreign interference 
Lambie has said on her website "It’s about time that the people in Parliament woke up to China’s attempts to infiltrate our economy and our democracy." Her concerns are echoed by Duncan Lewis, formerly the Director-General of Security at ASIO.

Taxation 
Upon its application to register as a political party in 2015, it was described that the party would "favour the introduction of a financial transactions tax".

Electoral history
At the 2016 federal election, the Jacqui Lambie Network fielded 10 candidates for the Senate (three each in Tasmania and New South Wales, and two each in Queensland and Victoria) but no candidates for seats in the House of Representatives.

Federal Parliament

Tasmanian Parliament

References 

Political parties in Australia
Political parties in Tasmania
Political parties established in 2015
Regionalist parties in Australia
Anti-Islam sentiment in Australia
2015 establishments in Australia
21st-century Australian politicians